"Just a Little Too Much" is a song written by Johnny Burnette and performed by Ricky Nelson. The song reached #9 on the Billboard Hot 100 and #11 in the UK in 1959. The song was featured on his 1959 album, Songs by Rick.

The song is ranked #78 on Billboard magazine's Top 100 songs of 1959.

Other versions
Col Joye released a version as a single in Australia in 1964.
Olivia Newton-John released a version as a single in 1972.  It was featured on her 1972 album, Olivia.
The Troggs released a version as a single in the United Kingdom in 1978.
Mac Curtis released a version on his 1981 album, Truckabilly.

References

1959 songs
1959 singles
1964 singles
1972 singles
Songs written by Johnny Burnette
Ricky Nelson songs
Olivia Newton-John songs
The Troggs songs
Imperial Records singles